Anatolijs Gorbunovs, also known as Anatoly Valeryanovich Gorbunov (born 10 February 1942, in Pilda parish, Ludza municipality, Latvia), is a Latvian politician who served as the Chairman of the Supreme Soviet during the final years of the Soviet regime in Latvia and as Chairman of the Supreme Council of Latvia during the first years after the country regained its independence.

In the latter capacity he was effectively the acting head of state before the election of the Fifth Saeima in 1993. He continued to serve as the Speaker of the Saeima until 1995.

Political career 
From 1974 to 1988, he held various positions in the Communist Party of Latvia, with his highest position being the Secretary of the Central Committee. Unlike many other Communist Party members in Latvia, Gorbunovs supported the Latvian independence movement. From 1988 to 1990 he was also Chairman of the Presidium of the Supreme Soviet. From 1989 through 1995, he was speaker of the Latvian parliament. During this period, Latvian independence was restored de facto in 1991.  As speaker of the parliament, Gorbunovs was acting State President per the 1922 Constitution until 1993, when Guntis Ulmanis was elected president.

Gorbunovs joined the Latvian Way party in 1993 and remained Speaker of the Saeima until 1995 and a member of parliament until 2002. Between 1995 and 2002, he served as Minister of Regional Development, Minister of Transportation and Deputy Prime Minister.

Awards 
 Order of the Badge of Honour (USSR, 1981) 
 Order of the Three Stars, 2nd Class (1995) 
 Order of the Dannebrog, Commander 1st Class (Denmark, 1997) 
 Order of the Cross of Terra Mariana, 1st Class (Estonia, 2002) 
 Medal of the Baltic Assembly (2011)
 The Cicero Award of the Latvian Academy of Sciences (2012)

Notes

References

External links 

1942 births
Living people
People from Ludza Municipality
Members of the Central Committee of the Communist Party of Latvia
Latvian Way politicians
Latvia's First Party/Latvian Way politicians
Heads of state of the Latvian Soviet Socialist Republic
Ministers of the Environment of Latvia
Speakers of the Saeima
Members of the Congress of People's Deputies of the Soviet Union
Members of the Supreme Soviet of the Latvian Soviet Socialist Republic, 1985–1990
Deputies of the Supreme Council of the Republic of Latvia
Deputies of the 5th Saeima
Deputies of the 6th Saeima
Deputies of the 7th Saeima
Candidates for President of Latvia
People of the Singing Revolution
Latvian independence activists
Riga Technical University alumni
Recipients of the Order of the Three Stars
Recipients of the Order of the Cross of Terra Mariana, 1st Class
Latvian people of Russian descent